Bloody May may refer to:

Historical events 
Blutmai, a 1929 riot between the Communist Party of Germany and the Berlin Police
Black May (1992), a popular name for the 17–20 May 1992 protest in Bangkok, Thailand